Dyschirius soda is a species of ground beetle in the subfamily Scaritinae. It was described by Dajoz in 2004.

References

soda
Beetles described in 2004